Darling is a census-designated place in Quitman County, Mississippi. Darling is located on Mississippi Highway 3, north of Marks. Per the 2020 Census, the population was 154.

The settlement was named after Mr. Darling, a railroad official.

Education
It is in the Quitman County School District.

Demographics

2020 census

Note: the US Census treats Hispanic/Latino as an ethnic category. This table excludes Latinos from the racial categories and assigns them to a separate category. Hispanics/Latinos can be of any race.

References

Census-designated places in Quitman County, Mississippi
Census-designated places in Mississippi